Ove Molin (born May 27, 1971) is a retired Swedish professional ice hockey player who spent most of his career with Brynäs IF in the Swedish Elite League.

Career statistics

References

External links 

1971 births
Swedish ice hockey right wingers
AIK IF players
Brynäs IF players
HIFK (ice hockey) players
Swedish expatriate ice hockey players in Finland
Living people